Checkmate is an American detective television series created by Eric Ambler, starring Anthony George, Sebastian Cabot, and Doug McClure. The show aired on CBS Television from 1960 to 1962 for a total of 70 episodes.  It was produced by Jack Benny's production company, "JaMco Productions" in co-operation with Revue Studios.  Guest stars included Charles Laughton, Peter Lorre, Lee Marvin, Mickey Rooney and many other prominent performers.

Synopsis
The program chronicles the cases of the San Francisco detective agency called Checkmate, Inc. Don Corey and Jed Sills run the agency, which specializes in preventing crimes before they happen, from Corey's stylish apartment supposedly at 3330 Union Street. Sebastian Cabot portrays Dr. Hyatt, a college professor whom they employ as an adviser. Dr. Hyatt's dachshund, Bismarck, occasionally appears. Ken Lynch is frequently seen as police dept. contact Lt. Thomas Brand.

Cast
 Anthony George as Don Corey
 Sebastian Cabot as Dr. Carl Hyatt
 Doug McClure as Jed Sills
 Ken Lynch as Lt. Thomas Brand
 Jack Betts as Chris Devlin

Notable guest stars
 Philip Abbott in "Trial by Midnight" (1962)
 Anna Maria Alberghetti in "Runaway" (1960)
 Dana Andrews in "Trial by Midnight" (1962)
 Eve Arden in "Death by Design" (1961)
 John Astin in 
 "The Yacht Club Gang" (1962), 
 "So Beats My Plastic Heart" (1962)
 Anne Baxter in "Death Runs Wild" (1960)
 Ralph Bellamy in "Portrait of a Man Running" (1961)
 Jack Benny in "A Funny Thing Happened on the Way to the Game" (1962)
 Charles Bickford in "Target Tycoon"(1960)
 Bill Bixby in "To the Best of My Recollection" (1961)
 Scott Brady in "Voyage into Fear" (1961)
 Lloyd Bridges in "The Two of Us" (1961)
 Ellen Burstyn in "The Bold and the Tough" (1962)
 Cyd Charisse in "Dance of Death" (1961)
 Sid Caesar in "Kill the Sound" (1961)
 James Coburn in "A Chant of Silence" (1962)
 Richard Conte in 
 "Moment of Truth" (1960), 
 "An Assassin Arrives Andante" (1962)
 Joseph Cotten in "Face in the Window" (1960)
 Carolyn Craig in "Trial by Midnight" (1962)
 Norma Crane in "Hour of Execution" (1961)
 John Dehner in "The Heat of Passion" (1961)
 Francis De Sales in "To the Best of My Recollection" (1961)
 Angie Dickinson in "Remembrances of Crimes Past" (1962)
 Donna Douglas in "The Deadly Silence" (1961)
 Buddy Ebsen in "Side by Side" (1962)
 Norman Fell in "Hot Wind in a Cold Town" (1961)
 Joan Fontaine in "Voyage into Fear" (1961)
 Ron Foster in "The Mask of Vengeance" (1960)
 Beverly Garland in "Between Two Guns" (1961)
 James Gregory in "Hour of Execution" (1961)
 Peter Helm in "Rendezvous in Washington" (1960)
 Celeste Holm in "So Beats My Plastic Heart" (1962)
 James Hong in "In a Foreign Quarter" (1962)
 Clegg Hoyt in "The Deadly Silence" (1961)
 Jeffrey Hunter in "Waiting for Jocko" (1961)
 David Janssen in "Ride a Wild Horse" (1962)
 Wright King as Jim Barker in "Portrait of a Man Running" (1961)  
 Otto Kruger in "A Funny Thing Happened on the Way to the Game" (1962)
 Martin Landau in 
 "Moment of Truth" (1960), 
 "Hot Wind in a Cold Town" (1961)
 Charles Laughton in "Terror from the East" (1961)
 Cloris Leachman in "The Mask of Vengeance" (1960)
 Julie London in "Goodbye, Griff" (1961)
 Jack Lord in "The Star System" (1962)
 Peter Lorre in "The Human Touch" (1961)
 Tina Louise in "A Funny Thing Happened on the Way to the Game" (1962)
 Dorothy Malone in "The Heat of Passion" (1961)
 Scott Marlowe in "Brooding Fixation" (1962)
 Lee Marvin in "Jungle Castle" (1961)
 Eve McVeagh in "A Very Rough Sketch" (1962)
 Tyler McVey in
 "Deadly Shadow" (1960), 
"To the Best of My Recollection" (1961), and 
"Side by Side" (1962)
 Vera Miles in "The Crimson Pool" (1961)
 Gary Merrill in "A Matter of Conscious" (1961)
 Ricardo Montalbán in "Hot Wind in a Cold Town" (1961)
 Elizabeth Montgomery in "The Star System" (1962)
 Mary Tyler Moore in "Lady on the Brink" (1960)
 Patricia Neal in "The Yacht Club Gang" (1962)
 Margaret O'Brien in "Deadly Shadow" (1960)
 Dan O'Herlihy in "Referendum on Murder" (1962)
 Susan Oliver in 
 "The Thrill Seeker" (1961), and 
 "So Beats My Plastic Heart" (1962)
 Eleanor Parker in "The Renaissance of Gussie Hill" (1962)
 Walter Pidgeon in "Death Beyond Recall" (1962)
 Stuart Randall in "The Cyanide Touch" (1960)
 Tony Randall in "The Button Down Break" (1961)
 Madlyn Rhue in "Target Tycoon" (1960)
 Jimmie Rodgers in "Melody for Murder" (1961) 
 Mickey Rooney in "The Paper Killer" (1961)
 Janice Rule in "The Mask of Vengeance" (1960)
 Barbara Rush in "The Dark Divide" (1960)
 George Sanders in "The Sound of Nervous Laughter" (1962)
 Dan Sheridan in "A Very Rough Sketch" (1962)
 Dean Stockwell in "Cyanide Touch" (1960)
 Olive Sturgess in "Brooding Fixation" (1962)
 Robert Vaughn in "Interrupted Honeymoon" (1960)
 James Whitmore in "Nice Guys Finish Last" (1961)
 Elen Willard in "Laugh Till I Die" (1961)
 John Williams in "The Murder Game" (1960)
 William Windom in "Through a Dark Glass" (1961)
 Jane Wyman in "Lady on the Brink" (1960)
 Keenan Wynn in "A Slight Touch of Venom" (1961)

Production
Some exterior scenes were filmed in San Francisco.

Series star Anthony George left his recurring role as Federal Agent Cam Allison on The Untouchables (starring Robert Stack), to front this series.

Episodes

Season 1 (1960–61)

Season 2 (1961–62)

Broadcast
CBS aired the series on Saturday in the 8:30-9:30 PM time slot from its début on September 17, 1960 until June 24, 1961.  The series finished at #21 among all series. It was then reprogrammed to Wednesday in the same time slot from October 4, 1961 to June 20, 1962, where it fell in the ratings opposite The Perry Como Show on NBC. CBS replaced it with The Beverly Hillbillies.

The series was also seen in Canada from 1961 on CTV during that network's initial season.

By 1963, it was re-run in syndication.

Home media
Timeless Media Group has released two "Best of..." collections on DVD in Region 1. Checkmate: The Best of Season 1 was released on October 30, 2009 and Checkmate: The Best of Season 2 was released on March 25, 2008. Timeless Media Group released Checkmate: The Complete Series on 14 DVDs on June 22, 2010 (Region 1).

Response
The series was a critical favorite. In 1961 John J. Lloyd won the show's sole Emmy nomination for Outstanding Achievement in Art Direction and Scenic Design. The icon for this series is swirling liquid shapes at the opening and closing of each episode with theme music by John Williams.

Comics
In 1962, Gold Key Comics published a two-issue comic book run based on the series.

References

External links

 
 
 Checkmate - The Interviews: An Oral History of Television

1960 American television series debuts
1962 American television series endings
1960s American crime drama television series
Black-and-white American television shows
CBS original programming
American detective television series
English-language television shows
Gold Key Comics titles
Television shows adapted into comics
Television series by Universal Television
Television shows set in San Francisco